Arman-Marshall Silla (born 13 July 1994) is a Belarusian taekwondo athlete. He represented Belarus at the 2016 Summer Olympics in Rio de Janeiro, in the men's +80 kg.

References

1994 births
Living people
Belarusian male taekwondo practitioners
Olympic taekwondo practitioners of Belarus
Taekwondo practitioners at the 2016 Summer Olympics
European Taekwondo Championships medalists
21st-century Belarusian people